Bacounoun is a village in Senegal situated in Basse-Casamance, to the south-west of Nyassia. It is part of the rural district (communauté rurale] of Nyassia in the arrondissement of Nyassia, part of the department of Ziguinchor in the region of Ziguinchor.

At the census of 2002, the settlement contained 170 inhabitants in 24 habitations.

External links
PEPAM

Populated places in the Ziguinchor Department